Tipperary Station is a pastoral lease that operates as a cattle station. The two adjoining sister properties are Elizabeth Downs and Litchfield Stations, all three currently operate as a single entity often referred to as the Tipperary Group.

Description
The area has a wide variety of natural watering points in the form of springs, creeks and swamps although some can dry up prior to the wet season.
The property shares a boundary with Litchfield National Park and Litchfield Station to the north, Ban Ban Springs and Douglas Stations to the east, unclaimed Crown Land to the south and the Malak Malak Aboriginal Land Trust to the west.

History

Established in 1914, the station was taken by William James Byrne who had previously owned a business in Brocks Creek, and eventually acquired Burnside station. By 1914 he sold Burnside and established Tipperary just beyond the Burnside boundary.

Byrne settled on the property with his wife Elizabeth and they had seven sons, only four of whom lived to adulthood.

Many cattle were killed in late 1925 along the river boundary to the station. Byrne posted a £50 reward for information leading to the conviction of the scoundrel responsible.

When William Byrne died in 1941, the station was left under the management of his widow and three remaining sons, who were also managing neighbouring Burnside Station.

Part of Tipperary was surrendered to the Crown in 1986 along with portions of Stapleton and Camp Creek pastoral leases to form Litchfield National Park.

The station was once owned by entrepreneur Warren Anderson who bought the property in the mid-1980s. Anderson built a zoo stocked with 1800–2200 animals including a pygmy hippopotamus and a rhinoceros. Other facilities included an indoor equestrian centre, an  bitumen runway suitable for a Boeing 727 to land, and resort accommodation. He had intended to stock the group with 200,000 head of cattle but struck financial problems and sold the property in 2003.

The group was then acquired by Melbourne-based barrister Allan Myers QC for $50 million along with the 80,000 cattle. Myers also acquired Elizabeth Downs, Fish River and Litchfield Stations.

The Australian Agricultural Company offered 105 million to acquire Tipperary and Litchfield stations along with the 60,000 head of cattle in 2009, but its shareholders voted against the acquisition at an extraordinary general meeting held three months later.

In 2011, the Australian Agricultural Company (AAco) purchased the Tipperary group's cattle herd of 53,000 head for 26 million, and also entered a one-year agreement to use the station group for agistment purposes with options to extend.

, David Warriner, the head of the Northern Territory Cattlemen's Association, was managing the group which was stocked with 70,000 cattle raised for live export to Indonesia.
In September 2014 AAco elected NOT to exercise their option to continue with the agistment agreement and decided to de-stock and exit the station by June 2015. 
In March of that year, 2015, ex Australian Agricultural Company chief operating officer, David Connolly was appointed as the general manager of the Tipperary Group and took over responsibility for the overall management of the group and the AAco drawdown and exit.

See also
List of ranches and stations

References

Stations (Australian agriculture)
Pastoral leases in the Northern Territory
1914 establishments in Australia
Litchfield National Park